Willowherbs are annual or perennial herbaceous plants in the flowering plant family Onagraceae. Willowherb may refer to:

 A species of willowherb in the genus Epilobium
 A species of willowherb in the genus Chamaenerion